The Canada Marine Act (CMA) (the Act) was passed in 1998 under the stewardship of David Collenette, who was Canada's Minister of Transport at that time. It was intended to modernize Canada's most important ports and make "the system of Canadian ports competitive, efficient and commercially oriented, providing for the establishing of port authorities and the divesting of certain harbours and ports, for the commercialization of the St. Lawrence Seaway and ferry services and other matters related to maritime trade and transport and amending the Pilotage Act and amending and repealing other Acts as a consequence."

The Act
The Act designated 19 ports as economically significant. Each of those ports was to have a port authority created for it. The Act made provisions to allow additional ports to have port authorities created to oversee their operation. The Act downloaded the mandate to oversee the operation of 150 smaller ports to the provinces or municipalities in which they were contained. Thirty-four remote ports remain under direct supervision by the Department of Transport.

An exception was made for the port facilities at Churchill, Manitoba, North America's only port on the Arctic Ocean connected to the North American Railroad Grid. The Port of Sydney, Nova Scotia, is also not part of this system. The Welland Canal, which is part of the Saint Lawrence Seaway, is regulated under the Fishing and Recreational Harbours Act (R.S., 1985, c. F-24), which falls to the Department of Fisheries and Oceans.  Port Dalhousie is subject to the Fishing and Recreational Harbours Regulations, while Port Colborne falls under the Ontario Fishery Regulations.

Responsibility for the construction and operation of canals had been given to the Department of Public Works at the time of Confederation, with the canals of the United Province of Canada having been previously operated by that colony's Department of Public Works. Since 1995, the Minister of Public Works and Government Services Canada has taken care of these affairs.  A vestigial reminder of the past is that the Ottawa River, which once was an important part of the economy with for example the Ottawa River timber trade, and "all canals or other cuttings for facilitating such navigation, and all dams, slides, piers, booms, embankments and other works of what kind or nature soever in the channel or waters" is wholly governed under this Ministry's An Act respecting certain works on the Ottawa River.  Most of the other heritage waterways of Ontario and a few in Quebec are governed by Parks Canada under the guidance of the Minister of the Environment.

The Act is, from time to time, supplemented by Regulations and Letters Patent published in the Canada Gazette.  Transport Canada maintains a helpful list of its "recent publications", which documents, among other things, the land transactions of the various Port Authorities.  The equivalent phrase to the English "Port Authority" is the French Administration Portuaire, so that one would google for "Administration Portuaire de Saguenay" or other Quebec emplacements.  A list of board member appointments to Port Authorities can be found at the respective individual Governor in Council Appointments appointments-nominations.gc.ca webpages of each organisation.  The Minister of Transport alone appoints the Chair of the Board, while in consultation with the Minister, the remaining Board members are selected by "users" of the Port. A "user" is determined as specified under the legislation, and cannot include City Councillors, civil servants or directors of Port customers.  Each Authority by now should have its own domain name website, at which can most likely be found copies of the Letters Patent and other legal documents.

An Act for making the system of Canadian ports competitive, efficient and commercially oriented, providing for the establishing of port authorities and the divesting of certain harbours and ports, for the commercialization of the St. Lawrence Seaway and ferry services and other matters related to maritime trade and transport and amending the Pilotage Act and amending and repealing other Acts as a consequence.

Recent activity 
 On 18 June 2019, the Hamilton Port Authority and the Oshawa Port Authority were amalgamated
 On 18 February 2012, Letters Patent were issued to promote the Oshawa Harbour Commission to a Port Authority.
 On 25 May 2013, the Canada Gazette published Letters Patent to announce a transaction of the Prince Rupert Port Authority
 On 16 November 2012, a project document was released about the Saguenay Port Authority intermodal container plan, which will impact the village of Tadoussac, and which needed the support of Denis Lebel, MP for Roberval—Lac-Saint-Jean and Minister of Transport from May 2011.  This project was planned forge a 12.5 km link from Tadoussac with the trans-Canada rail line at Saguenay.
 On 9 February 2013, the Canada Gazette published Letters Patent to announce the purchase of lands for the Saguenay Port Authority.
 On 25 May 2013, the Canada Gazette published Letters Patent to announce six purchases and one sale of the Saguenay Port Authority.
 On 2 November 2013, the Canada Gazette published Letters Patent that signified the sale of lands under control of the Thunder Bay Port Authority to Noma Brokerage Ltd.
 On January 1, 2008, the Vancouver Port Authority, Fraser River Port Authority and North Fraser Port Authority were amalgamated.
 On 16 March 2013, the Canada Gazette published Letters Patent that signified the termination of a leasehold arrangement at Goyeau Street for the Headquarters of the Windsor Port Authority, and the acquisition of a replacement at Sandwich Street.

CMA Port Authorities

See also 
 List of ports and harbors of the Arctic Ocean
 List of ports and harbours of the Atlantic Ocean
 List of ports and harbors of the Pacific Ocean

References 

Canadian federal legislation
1998 in Canadian law
Water transport in Canada
Canadian transport law